Gartan is a parish in County Donegal, Ireland. It is best known for being the birthplace of Columba, one of the three patron saints of Ireland and one of the most revered saints in the Christian world. Here he founded a monastery in 521. The popular song "Gartan Mother's Lullaby" comes from the area, and has been performed by many artists, including American actress Meryl Streep.

From the book Kenny, by Leona Dalrymple (The Reilly & Britton Co., Chicago, 1917):

Gallery

References

External links
 Parish of Gartan and Termon
 Gartan Outdoor Education Centre
 View of Lough Gartan from the burial ground at Gartan Rath
 Photo of birthplace of St. Columba at Gartan
 Photo of Lough Gartan seen from the burial ground at Gartan Rath

Civil parishes of County Donegal